Kepler-25c is an exoplanet orbiting the star Kepler-25, located in the constellation Lyra. The planet was first detected as a candidate extrasolar planet by the Kepler space telescope in 2011. It was confirmed, in 2012, by Jason Steffen and collaborators using transit-timing variations obtained by the Kepler Space Telescope. It orbits its parent star at only 0.110 astronomical units away, and at its distance it completes an orbit once every 12.7 days.

References

Exoplanets discovered by the Kepler space telescope
Exoplanets discovered in 2012
Kepler-25